Robert George Uecker (born January 26, 1934) is an American former Major League Baseball (MLB) player and current sportscaster, comedian, and actor.

Facetiously dubbed "Mr. Baseball" by TV talk show host Johnny Carson, Uecker has served as a play-by-play announcer for Milwaukee Brewers radio broadcasts since 1971. He was honored by the National Baseball Hall of Fame with its 2003 Ford C. Frick Award in recognition of his broadcasting career.

Early life and playing career

Though he has sometimes joked that he was born on an oleo run to Illinois, Uecker was born and raised in Milwaukee, Wisconsin, the son of August "Gus" Uecker, who immigrated from Switzerland in 1923, and Marie Schultz Uecker, originally from Michigan. He has two younger sisters, Carol Ann and Rosemary. He grew up watching the minor-league Milwaukee Brewers at Borchert Field. He signed a professional contract with his hometown Milwaukee Braves in 1956. With the Braves, Uecker bounced around for six years, playing with affiliates at various levels. In his first year he played in Class C, with the Eau Claire Bears in the Northern League and Boise in the Pioneer League. Between both of the clubs, he hit 19 home runs. Uecker made his Major League Baseball debut as a catcher with the club in 1962. A below-average hitter, he finished with a career batting average of .200. He was generally considered to be a sound defensive player and committed very few errors in his Major League career as a catcher, completing his career with a fielding percentage of .981. However, in 1967, despite playing only 59 games, he led the league in passed balls and is still on the top 10 list for most passed balls in a season. At least a partial explanation is that he spent a good deal of the season catching knuckleballer Phil Niekro. He often joked that the best way to catch a knuckleball was to wait until it stopped rolling and pick it up. Uecker also played for the St. Louis Cardinals (and was a member of the 1964 World Champion club) and Philadelphia Phillies before returning to the Braves, who had by then moved to Atlanta. His six-year Major League career concluded in 1967.

Perhaps the biggest highlight of Uecker's career was when he hit a home run off future Hall of Famer Sandy Koufax, after which Uecker joked that he always feared that home run would keep Koufax from getting into the Hall of Fame.

Broadcasting career

After retiring as a player, Uecker returned to Milwaukee. In 1971, he began calling play-by-play for the Milwaukee Brewers' radio broadcasts, a position he holds to this day. Uecker's tenure as a Brewers broadcaster  (51 years as of the 2022 season) is the second-longest continuous tenure with one team among active Major League Baseball announcers, trailing only Kansas City Royals broadcaster Denny Matthews (1969–present).

During his Brewers tenure, Uecker has mentored Pat Hughes, Jim Powell, Cory Provus and Joe Block, all of whom became primary radio announcers for other MLB teams. For several years he also served as a color commentator for network television broadcasts of Major League Baseball, helping call games for ABC in the 1970s and early '80s and NBC (teaming with Bob Costas and Joe Morgan) in the 1990s. During that time, he was a commentator for several League Championship Series and World Series. He also called the 1982 World Series locally for the Brewers on WISN in Milwaukee.

Prior to the 2021 season, Uecker had never signed an official written contract with the Brewers to do the team's play-by-play, instead agreeing to do so via an undisclosed number of handshake agreements with either Bud Selig or Mark Attanasio, the owners of the team. He finally signed a contract in 2021, in order to be covered under the Brewers' health insurance plan after cuts to his SAG-AFTRA benefits for acting work.

As of 2022, Uecker teams with Jeff Levering and Lane Grindle to call Brewers home games on WTMJ in Milwaukee and the Brewers Radio Network throughout Wisconsin. He is well known for saying his catchphrase "Get up! Get up! Get outta here! Gone!" when a Brewers player hits a home run.

Sports expertise outside baseball
Uecker's sports expertise extends beyond baseball. He hosted two syndicated television shows, Bob Uecker's Wacky World of Sports and Bob Uecker's War of the Stars. The former has since become known as The Lighter Side of Sports (albeit with a different host, Mike Golic) and remains one of the longest-running syndicated sports programs in American television history.

Uecker also appeared in a series of commercials for the Milwaukee Admirals of the American Hockey League in the mid-1990s, including one in which he re-designed the team's uniforms to feature a garish plaid reminiscent of the loud sports coats synonymous with Uecker in the 1970s and 1980s. In February 2006, the Admirals commemorated those commercials with a special event in which the players wore the plaid jerseys during a game. The jerseys were then auctioned off to benefit charity.

Wrestling announcer
In March 1987, Uecker appeared at World Wrestling Federation's (WWF, now WWE) WrestleMania III in Pontiac, Michigan, as the ring announcer for the pay-per-view's main event of Hulk Hogan versus André the Giant. He returned in 1988 at WrestleMania IV as a ringside announcer, commentator during the opening Battle Royal and backstage interviewer. One famous WrestleMania segment saw André the Giant choking Uecker. His introduction of André from WrestleMania III can be heard in WWE's signature introduction during each of the organization's television broadcasts and home video releases.

Humor
Known for his humor, particularly about his undistinguished playing career, Uecker actually became much better known after he retired from playing. He made some 100 guest appearances on Johnny Carson's Tonight Show. During one Tonight Show appearance, Carson asked him what the biggest thrill of his professional baseball career was and with his typical dry wit Uecker replied, "Watching a fan fall out of the upper deck in Philadelphia; the crowd booed." Most of his wisecracks poked fun at himself. He once joked that after he hit a grand slam off pitcher Ron Herbel, "When his manager came out to get him, he was bringing Herbel's suitcase." On another occasion, he quipped, "Sporting goods companies would pay me not to endorse their products." On his later acting career, he commented, "Even when I played baseball, I was acting." Even when he was announcing games, he often said some outlandish things, like during a particularly bad game the Brewers were playing in, where he reportedly said, "A couple of grand-slammys and the Brewers are right back in it."

Uecker also appeared in a number of humorous commercials, most notably for Miller Lite beer, as one of the "Miller Lite All-Stars".

Uecker authored two books, an autobiography titled Catcher in the Wry, and Catch 222.

In recognition of his humor, the children's jokes book Just for Kicks! 600 Knock-Out Jokes, Puns and Riddles About Sports is dedicated to Uecker, as well as Max Patkin and Bill Veeck, for "keeping baseball fun."

Health problems
On April 27, 2010, Uecker announced that he was going to miss 10–12 weeks of the 2010 baseball season because of heart surgery. His aortic valve and a portion of his aortic root were successfully replaced four days later, and he returned to broadcasting for the Brewers on July 23. On October 14, 2010, the Brewers announced Uecker would again undergo heart surgery, this time to repair a tear at the site of his valve replacement.

Honors

The National Sportscasters and Sportswriters Association named Uecker as Wisconsin Sportscaster of the Year five times (1977, 1979, 1981, 1982, 1987), and inducted him into its Hall of Fame in 2011.

Uecker was inducted into the National Radio Hall of Fame in 2001. In 2003, he received the Ford C. Frick Award, bestowed annually by the Baseball Hall of Fame to a broadcaster for "major contributions to baseball." His humorous and self-deprecating speech was a highlight of the ceremony.

In 2005, Uecker's 50th year in professional baseball, the Milwaukee Brewers placed a number 50 in his honor in their "Ring of Honor", near the retired numbers of Robin Yount and Paul Molitor. Four years later, on May 12, 2009, Uecker's name was also added to the Braves Wall of Honor inside American Family Field.

Uecker was inducted into the Celebrity Wing of the WWE Hall of Fame in 2010, honored for his appearances at WrestleMania III and WrestleMania IV.

On August 31, 2012, the Brewers erected the Uecker Monument outside American Family Field alongside statues of Hank Aaron, Robin Yount and Bud Selig.

Uecker was inducted into the Baseball Reliquary's Shrine of the Eternals in 2017.

Wisconsin Governor Tony Evers declared September 25, 2021, as Bob Uecker Day in honor of his 50th year broadcasting Brewers games. Uecker threw out the first pitch in the game against the New York Mets. But instead of throwing the ball to the catcher, he unveiled a pitching machine and used that. Before the game, leftfielder Christian Yelich presented a gift on behalf of the players, a pair of custom Nike sneakers with "Air Uecker" and "Get Up, Get Up" on one foot and "One Of Us" and "Just a Bit Outside" on the other.

Acting roles

Uecker has had a number of acting roles in ads, TV shows and movies.

He played the character of father and sportswriter George Owens on the 1985–1990 sitcom Mr. Belvedere, appearing regularly.

He also appeared in a series of Miller Lite commercials starting in the 1980s. In one commercial from that decade, Uecker was seen preparing to watch a baseball game when an usher informs him he is in the wrong seat. Uecker pompously remarks, "I must be in the front row", which became another of his catchphrases. The punch line was that Uecker's seat was actually in the nosebleed section. Since then, the farthest seats from the action in some arenas and stadiums have been jokingly called "Uecker seats". There is a section of $1 seating called the "Uecker seats" at American Family Field, which is an obstructed-view area in the upper grandstand above home plate where the stadium's roof pivot comes together (in reference to one of his Miller Lite commercials). Another of Uecker's catchphrases from the aforementioned Miller Lite 'front row' commercial is, "He missed the tag!" which he yells with confidence from his seat in the top row of the upper deck of the stadium, far away from the action.

Uecker made cameo appearances as himself in the films O.C. and Stiggs, and Fatal Instinct, and in episodes of the sitcoms Who's the Boss?, D.C. Follies, and LateLine. He was the voice of the "head of Bob Uecker" in the Futurama episode "A Leela of Her Own". Another prominent role was as Harry Doyle, the broadcaster for the Cleveland Indians, in the Major League film trilogy. In the movies, Uecker's character is known for his witticisms and his tendency to become intoxicated from drinking during losing games, as well as downplaying poor play by the team for the radio audience: for example, in the first film he also coins another popular sports catchphrase "Juuust a bit outside", to downplay an extremely wild pitch from Ricky "Wild Thing" Vaughn. Uecker received the role not because of his broadcasting history with the Brewers but because of his popular Miller Lite commercials.

In 2021, Uecker made a guest appearance in the Disney+ series Monsters at Work where he voiced a parody of himself named "Bob Yucker".

Personal life 
Uecker and his first wife, Joyce (died 2015), had four children, Leeann, Steve, Sue Ann and Bob Jr. Steve (1959–2012), a cowboy, died of complications of San Joaquin Valley Fever. Leeann (1957–2022) died in March 2022 of ALS.

Uecker and his second wife, Judy, were married in Louisiana in 1976 and divorced in 2001. At the time of the divorce, he lived in Menomonee Falls, Wisconsin.

References

External links

Bob Uecker at the Baseball Hall of Fame

Bob Uecker Quotes
Bob Uecker interview on OnMilwaukee.com

1934 births
20th-century American male actors
21st-century American male actors
Baseball players from Milwaukee
American color commentators
American male film actors
American male television actors
American male voice actors
American radio sports announcers
American television sports announcers
Atlanta Braves players
Atlanta Crackers players
Boise Braves players
Denver Bears players
Eau Claire Braves players
Evansville Braves players
Ford C. Frick Award recipients
Indianapolis Indians players
Jacksonville Braves players
Living people
Louisville Colonels (minor league) players
Major League Baseball broadcasters
Major League Baseball catchers
Milwaukee Braves players
Milwaukee Brewers announcers
Philadelphia Phillies players
Professional wrestling announcers
Radio personalities from Milwaukee
St. Louis Cardinals players
Wichita Braves players
WWE Hall of Fame inductees